William Louis "Dutch" Hinrichs (April 27, 1889 – April 18, 1972) was a pitcher in Major League Baseball. He played for the Washington Senators in 1910.

References

External links

1889 births
1972 deaths
Major League Baseball pitchers
Washington Senators (1901–1960) players
Baseball players from California
Sportspeople from Orange, California
Occidental Tigers baseball players